Caligula cachara is a moth of the family Saturniidae. It was described by Frederic Moore in 1872. It is found in eastern Asia, including Thailand.

Caligula (moth)
Moths described in 1872
Moths of Asia
Taxa named by Frederic Moore